Proto-Nahuan (also called Proto-Aztecan) is a hypothetical daughter language of the Proto-Uto-Aztecan language. It is the common ancestor from which the modern Nahuan languages have developed.

Homeland

There is some controversy about where and when Proto-Nahuan was spoken. Following Nahuan ethnohistorical sources describing a southward migration of Nahuatl speakers, as well as the fact that all other Uto-Aztecan languages are north of the Nahuan languages, the homeland has traditionally been considered to be located to the north of the current area of extension.

An alternative hypothesis by Jane Hill is that Proto-Nahuatl arose within Mesoamerica, and the Nahuas are the only remainders of a large-scale northward migration.

Phonology
The following phonological changes are shared by all Nahuan languages:

Proto-Uto-Aztecan *t becomes Proto-Nahuan lateral affricate  before Proto-Uto-Aztecan *a (Proto-Uto-Aztecan *taːka 'man' becomes Proto-Nahuan *tlaːka-tla 'man').
Proto-Uto-Aztecan initial *p is lost in Proto-Nahuan (Proto-Uto-Aztecan *pahi 'water' becomes Proto-Nahuan *aː-tla 'water').
Proto-Uto-Aztecan *u merges with *i in Proto-Nahuan *i (Proto-Uto-Aztecan *muki 'to die' becomes Proto-Nahuan *miki 'to die').
Proto-Uto-Aztecan sibilants *ts and *s split into *ts, *ch and *s , respectively.
Many metatheses in which Proto-Uto-Aztecan roots of the shape *CVCV become *VCCV (Proto-Uto-Aztecan *puːli 'to tie' becomes Proto-Nahuan *ilpi 'to tie').

Morphology
Proto-Nahuan was an agglutinative language, and its words used suffix complexes for a variety of purposes, with several morphemes strung together.

Lexicon
Some Proto-Aztecan (i.e., Proto-Nahuan) reconstructions by Davletshin (2012):

{| class="wikitable sortable"
! gloss !! Proto-Aztecan
|-
| all (todos) || *mochɨ-m
|-
| ashes || *nɨx-tlɨ
|-
| bark || *ɨwaː-yoː-tl
|-
| belly || *-ɨhtɨ
|-
| big || *wehey(ɨ)
|-
| bird || *toːtoː-tl
|-
| bite || *-kɨh-tzoma
|-
| black || *tliːl-tɨ-k
|-
| blood || *ɨs-tlɨ
|-
| bone || *oːmɨ-tl
|-
| breast || *-chiːchiːwal
|-
| burn tr. || *-tla-tɨ-ha
|-
| claw (nail) || *-ɨstɨ
|-
| cloud || *mix-tlɨ
|-
| cold || *sese-k
|-
| come || *wiːtz (preterit-as-present form)
|-
| die || *mɨki
|-
| drink || *-ihi
|-
| dry || *waːk
|-
| ear || *nakas-tlɨ
|-
| earth || *tlaːl-lɨ
|-
| eat || *-kwa-haː
|-
| eye || *-iːx
|-
| feather || *-ɨ?wɨ
|-
| fire || *tlahi-tl
|-
| fish || *mɨ-chɨ-m
|-
| fly || *patlaːni
|-
| foot || *-ɨkxɨ
|-
| full || *teːn-tok
|-
| give tr. || *-maka
|-
| good || *yeːk-tlɨ
|-
| hair || *-tzom
|-
| hand || *-mah
|-
| head || *-kwah
|-
| hear || *-kaki
|-
| heart || *-yoːl
|-
| I || *naha
|-
| kill || *mɨk-tɨ-ha
|-
| knee || *-tlan-kwah
|-
| know || *mati
|-
| leaf || *ɨswa-tl
|-
| lie || *mo-teːka
|-
| long || *weheya-k
|-
| louse || *atɨmɨ-tl
|-
| man || *tlaːka-tl
|-
| many || *mɨyak
|-
| meat || *naka-tl
|-
| moon || *meːtz-tlɨ
|-
| mountain || *tɨpeː-tl
|-
| mouth || *teːn-tlɨ
|-
| name || *toːkaːhɨ-tl
|-
| neck || *kəch-tlɨ
|-
| new || *yankwi-k
|-
| night || *yowal-lɨ
|-
| nose || *yaka-tl
|-
| one || *seː(m)
|-
| red || *chiːl-tɨ-k ?
|-
| road || *oh-tlɨ
|-
| root || *nelwa-tl ?
|-
| round || *yawal-tɨ-k ?
|-
| sand || *xaːl-lɨ
|-
| see || *-ɨhta
|-
| seed || *aːch-tlɨ
|-
| sit || *mo-tlalɨ-ha
|-
| skin || *eːwa-tl
|-
| sleep || *kochɨ
|-
| smoke || *poːk-tlɨ ?
|-
| stand || *kɨtza
|-
| star || *sitlalɨ-m
|-
| stone || *tə-tl
|-
| tail || *-kwitla-pɨl
|-
| that || *oːn- ?
|-
| this || *in- ?
|-
| thou || *təha
|-
| tongue || *-nɨnɨ-pɨl
|-
| tooth || *-tlan
|-
| tree || *kwa-wɨ-tl
|-
| two || *oːmə
|-
| walk (go) || *nɨh-nɨmi
|-
| warm (hot) || *to-toːnɨ-k ?
|-
| water || *aː-tl
|-
| we || *təha-mɨ-t
|-
| what || *tla-(hi ?)
|-
| white || *istaː-kɨ ?
|-
| who || *aːk
|-
| woman || *si/owaː-tl
|-
| yellow || *kos-tɨ-k ?
|}

References

Sources
 
 
 
 
 

Agglutinative languages
Nahuan languages
Proto-languages